Ricardo Bravo (born 25 June 1970) is a Peruvian footballer. He played in seven matches for the Peru national football team in 1991. He was also part of Peru's squad for the 1991 Copa América tournament.

References

External links
 

1970 births
Living people
Peruvian footballers
Peru international footballers
Association football defenders
Footballers from Lima